The heat shock protein 70 (Hsp70) internal ribosome entry site (IRES) is an RNA element that allows cap independent translation during conditions such as heat shock and stress. It has been shown that the 216 nucleotide long 5' UTR contains internal ribosome entry site activity.

References

External links 
 

Cis-regulatory RNA elements